Briquetia is a genus of flowering plants belonging to the family Malvaceae.

Its native range is Mexico to Tropical America.

Species:

Briquetia brasiliensis 
Briquetia denudata 
Briquetia inermis 
Briquetia sonorae 
Briquetia spicata

References

Malvaceae
Malvaceae genera